Group B of the 1998 Fed Cup Europe/Africa Zone Group II was one of five pools in the Europe/Africa zone of the 1998 Fed Cup. Five teams competed in a round robin competition, with the top team advancing to Group I for 1999.

Finland vs. Botswana

Egypt vs. Liechtenstein

Finland vs. Egypt

Finland vs. Liechtenstein

Macedonia vs. Liechtenstein

Macedonia vs. Botswana

Macedonia vs. Egypt

Liechtenstein vs. Botswana

Finland vs. Macedonia

Egypt vs. Botswana

  placed first in this group and thus advanced to Group I for 1999, where they placed last in their pool of four and was thus relegated back to Group II for 2000.

See also
Fed Cup structure

References

External links
 Fed Cup website

1998 Fed Cup Europe/Africa Zone